Apocryphon: Electro Roots 1982–1985 is a 2-CD compilation album by the synthpop band Information Society. It includes their early 1980s independent releases, The InSoc EP and Creatures of Influence, in remastered form, as well as rare and live tracks, and a 30-page color booklet with photographs of the band in their early days.

Track listing
Disc 1
 "Bacchanale"
 "Fall In Line"
 "Growing Up With Shiva"
 "Get Up Away From That Thing"
 "Can You Live As Fast As Me"
 "You Are My Hiroshima"
 "Running"
 "Creatures of Influence"
 "Don't Lose Your Mind"
 "Fall In Line"
 "Signals"
 "The Swamp"

Disc 2
 "Hey Hey Hey"
 "Hooked On Pablum"
 "Nothing Sacred (1983)"
 "Nothing Sacred (2007)"
 "The Orthodox Pleasure Song"
 "XMAS At Our House"
 "Disco's Not Dead (It's Only Sleeping)"
 "Wrongful Death (1982)"
 "Wrongful Death (2007)"
 "I Hate Music"
 "The INSOC Commercial"
 "New And Different"
 "Chant Your Way"
 "Say It, Say It"
 "Growing Up With Shiva (2008)

External links
Information Society web site

Information Society (band) albums
2008 compilation albums